The Panzer-Stabmine 43 was a German anti-tank mine, together with the Hohl-Sprung mine 4672 it was the first mine to combine a shaped charge warhead with a tilt-rod fuze. The mine was developed during the Second World War. The mine consisted of a wine glass shaped metal main body mounted on a wooden post, with a tilt rod holding arm projecting to one side. It used a 125 mm diameter warhead with 1.6 kg of explosive, and a combination pressure/tilt fuze.

At a stand-off distance of about half a meter the main charge could penetrate up to 100 millimeter of armour. Testing conducted by the German army indicated that the mine stood a 65 to 68 percent chance of knocking out a tank.

The mine entered service in 1943, and around 25,000 were produced before production was terminated in late 1943 or early 1944 due to "jealousies within Army departments".

Specifications
 Height of mine body (excluding wooden post): 0.35 m
 Weight: 3 kg approx
 Explosive content: 0.8 kg

References
 List of German Second World War land mines at lexikon-der-wehrmacht.de
 Инженерные боеприпасы

Anti-tank mines
World War II weapons of Germany
Land mines of Germany
Weapons and ammunition introduced in 1943